Baptiste Guillaume (born 16 June 1995) is a Belgian professional footballer who plays as a striker for French club Guingamp.

Career
A youth exponent of Lens, Guillaume made his debut in the Ligue 2 during the 2012–2013 season. He scored his first professional goal against Nîmes Olympique. He made his first start for the club on 24 October 2014, in a 2–0 victory against Toulouse.

In June 2022, Guillaume signed a two-year deal with Guingamp.

References

External links
 
 

1995 births
Living people
Footballers from Brussels
Association football forwards
Belgian footballers
Belgium under-21 international footballers
Belgium youth international footballers
Ligue 1 players
Ligue 2 players
RC Lens players
Lille OSC players
RC Strasbourg Alsace players
Angers SCO players
Nîmes Olympique players
Valenciennes FC players
En Avant Guingamp players
Belgian expatriate footballers
Expatriate footballers in France
Belgian expatriate sportspeople in France